Jared Stern is an American screenwriter, director and producer. He collaborated with John Whittington on The Lego Batman Movie (2017) and The Lego Ninjago Movie (2017).

Career 
Stern began his career by writing the screenplay for Mr. Popper's Penguins. In 2012, he wrote for the comedy film The Watch. The following year, he wrote the comedy film The Internship. In 2014, Stern was hired to write The Lego Movie 2: The Second Part, but eventually moved on to writing the spinoffs The Lego Batman Movie and The Lego Ninjago Movie. In the same year, he wrote a script based on the Disney theme park attraction It's a Small World. In 2015, he wrote and created the television series Dr. Ken. In 2017, he produced the live action film It Happened in L.A.

After writing screenplays, Stern directed his feature film debut, Happy Anniversary, a 2018 Netflix film. He also served as an executive producer on Storks and Smallfoot. In 2019, he created the animated series Green Eggs and Ham, based on the Dr. Seuss book of the same name. In 2020, he signed on to produce the Warner Bros. film Toto. He gained notability from directing the DC Comics film DC League of Super-Pets. He teamed up with Robert Zemeckis to write the HBO Max streaming series Tooned Out.

Filmography

Feature films 

Producer only
 Storks (2016, executive)
 It Happened in L.A. (2017)
 Smallfoot (2018, executive)

Creative consultant
 The Lego Batman Movie (2017)
 The Lego Ninjago Movie (2017)
 The Lego Movie 2: The Second Part (2019)

Television

References

External links 
 

21st-century American male writers
21st-century American screenwriters
American film directors
American male screenwriters
Living people
Place of birth missing (living people)
Year of birth missing (living people)
Warner Bros. Discovery people
Warner Bros. people
Warner Bros. Cartoons people
Warner Bros. Animation people